"Perfect Day" is a single by British band EMF. It was the first single from their album Cha Cha Cha. The single was released in February 1995 and reaching number 27 on the UK Singles Chart.

Singles

CDR 6401

"Perfect Day" (Album Version) 
"Angel" 
"I Won't Give in to You"
"Kill for You" (Lo-Fi Mix)

CDR 6401 (The Remixes)
"Perfect Day" (Perfect Mix) 
"Perfect Day" (Chris and James Epic Adventure) 
"Perfect Day" (Black One Remix) 
"Perfect Day" (Toytown Mix)

Music video 

The music video was shot in Florida and had the band roaming around doing different things. It also shows random shots of locals and also shows the band posing as locals.

1995 singles
EMF (band) songs
1995 songs
EMI Records singles